The Doctor of Health Science (DHSc or DHS) is a post-professional academic doctoral degree for those who intend to pursue or advance a professional practice career in Health Sciences and Health Care Delivery Systems, which can include clinical practice, education, administration, and research.  Master's credentials are a requirement for DHSc programs. Individuals who complete the DHSc face the particular challenge of understanding and adapting scientific knowledge in order to achieve health gain and results. This degree leads to a career in high-level administration, teaching, applied research, or practice, where advanced analytical and conceptual capabilities are required. The Doctor of Health Science is a degree that prepares scholarly professionals in healthcare and leadership roles. The first Doctor of Health Science degree was offered in 2000 by the University of St. Augustine for Health Sciences.

Background
In Europe and Australia, the degree is awarded after completion of two to three years of coursework and research beyond the Master's degree. Like its European counterparts, an individual typically has to complete three to four years of study beyond the master's degree. In order to be accepted into the program, a person must possess a master's degree from a regionally accredited United States university, and have prior health care experience.  In addition to completing two to four years of intensive course work, candidates must typically complete an applied research project or dissertation.

Comparison
A majority of DHSc programs have been compared in course content to the Doctor of Public Health (DrPH), Doctor of Health Administration (DHA), Doctor of Science (ScD), and the Doctor of Philosophy in Health Science (PhD) degrees, but often distinguishes itself from these degrees in focus and scholarship requirements. Furthermore, Master's credential health professionals (e.g., Occupational Therapist, Physical Therapist, Physician Assistant, Pathologists' assistant, Public Health, Radiographer, Respiratory Therapist,  Speech and language therapist, Health Education Specialist (CHES/MCHES), advanced practice clinicians/diagnosticians with master's degrees, as well as mid- and executive-level healthcare administrators and educators, and public health professionals) are drawn to the DHSc credential in an effort to advance their careers toward top executive echelons and academic appointments.

It is recommended individuals seeking academic teaching positions in higher education choose a DHS/DHSc program that culminates in a dissertation or doctoral research project.

Programs of study

Regionally accredited
 A.T. Still University
 Bay Path University
 California University of Pennsylvania
 Campbell University
 Drexel University
 East Stroudsburg University
 Eastern Virginia Medical School
 George Washington University
 Indiana State University
 Keiser University 
 Massachusetts College of Pharmacy and Health Sciences
 Nova Southeastern University
 Radford University
 Thomas Jefferson University
 Touro University Worldwide
 University of Indianapolis
 University of Bridgeport
 University of New Haven
 University of North Texas

Regionally accredited: former programs
 Loma Linda University
 Midwestern University
 University of St. Augustine

Europe
 University of Nottingham
 De Montfort University
 Staffordshire University
 University of Portsmouth
 University of Worcester
 University of Bath

Australia
 Queensland University of Technology
 Charles Sturt University
 University of Tasmania

Hong Kong
 Hong Kong Polytechnic University

New Zealand
 Auckland University of Technology

See also
 Doctor of Public Health
 Doctor of Health Administration
 Doctor of Nursing Practice
 Doctor of Physical Therapy

References

External links
 Salary and Employment Info for a Doctor of Health Science Degree from Education-Portal.com

Health Science